Kenny Tobechi Ejim (3 December 1994 – 14 February 2022) was a Canadian professional basketball player.

Playing career
A power forward, Ejim played professionally in Spain, Canada and Bahrain.

Death
Ejim died on 14 February 2022, at his apartment in Manama, Bahrain, while playing for Al-Najma of the Bahraini Premier League. An investigation ruled out foul play.

See also 
 List of basketball players who died during their careers

References

External links

 Player Profile at eurobasket.com
 Player Profile at realgm.com
 Player Profile at proballers.com

1994 births
2022 deaths
Basketball players from Toronto
Sportspeople from Brampton
Canadian expatriate basketball people in Spain
Canadian men's basketball players
Canadian sportspeople of Nigerian descent
Black Canadian basketball players
Power forwards (basketball)
Humber College alumni
Saskatchewan Rattlers players
Hamilton Honey Badgers players